Yoann Wachter (born 7 April 1992) is a French-born Gabonese international footballer who plays as a midfielder for US Saint-Malo.

Club career 
Wachter is a youth exponent from Lorient. He made his Ligue 1 debut on 10 August 2014 against AS Monaco.

International career
Wacther was born in France to a Gabonese father, and a French-Guadeloupean mother. Wachter received a callup to the Gabon national football team for a match against Mauritania on 28 May 2016. He made his debut in a 1–1 tie with Comoros on 15 November 2016.

Career statistics

References

1992 births
Living people
People from Courbevoie
People with acquired Gabonese citizenship
Gabonese footballers
Gabon international footballers
French footballers
French people of Guadeloupean descent
French sportspeople of Gabonese descent
Gabonese people of French descent
Association football midfielders
Ligue 1 players
Championnat National players
Championnat National 2 players
Championnat National 3 players
FC Lorient players
CS Sedan Ardennes players
Limoges FC players
US Saint-Malo players
2017 Africa Cup of Nations players
Footballers from Hauts-de-Seine